Luciano Santolini (born 13 February 1953) is a Sammarinese sports shooter. He competed in the mixed trap event at the 1984 Summer Olympics.

References

1953 births
Living people
Sammarinese male sport shooters
Olympic shooters of San Marino
Shooters at the 1984 Summer Olympics
Place of birth missing (living people)